Cicero is a station on the 'L' system, serving the Blue Line's Forest Park branch. It is located in the median of the Eisenhower Expressway and serving the Austin neighborhood. Originally, Cicero had an additional entrance at Lavergne Avenue, but this was closed on May 16, 1977, by the CTA as a cost-cutting measure. The structure for this exit still stands but it is closed to the public.

This is the last station on the Forest Park branch within the Chicago city limits. It is located a short distance from the Town of Cicero.

Bus connections
CTA

 7 Harrison (Weekdays only) 
 54 Cicero 
 57 Laramie 

Pace

 305 East Roosevelt Road 
 316 Laramie Avenue (Monday-Saturday only) 
 392 Green Line Cicero CTA/UPS Hodgkins (Weekday UPS shifts only)

Notes and references

Notes

References

External links
Cicero (Congress Line) Station Page
LaVergne Avenue entrance (closed) from Google Maps Street View
Cicero Avenue entrance from Google Maps Street View

CTA Blue Line stations
Railway stations in the United States opened in 1958